Wcisło is a Polish surname. Notable people with the surname include:

 Emilia Wcisło (born 1942), Polish politician
 Marta Wcisło (born 1969), Polish politician
 Ryszard Wcisło (1933–2015), Polish scout leader

See also
 

Polish-language surnames